Backlash may refer to:

Literature 
 Backlash: The Undeclared War Against American Women, a 1991 book by Susan Faludi
 Backlash (Star Wars novel), a 2010 novel by Aaron Allston
 Backlash (Marc Slayton), comic book character
 Backlash (alternative title to: A Plague on Both Your Causes), a novel by John Brunner

Music 
Backlash (Bad English album), 1991
Backlash (Freddie Hubbard album), 1967
 Backlash, an album by Nina Simone
"Backlash", a 1991 song by Joan Jett from the album Notorious 
"Backlash" (song), by 10 Years

Film 
 Backlash (1947 film), an American film noir starring Jean Rogers
 Backlash (1956 film), an American Western starring Richard Widmark
 Backlash (1986 film), an Australian drama directed by Bill Bennett
 Backlash (1994 film), an American film starring Sunny Doench

Other media 
 WWE Backlash, an annual World Wrestling Entertainment event
 Backlash, a Demolition Vehicle in the video game Blast Corps

Other uses
 Backlash (engineering), clearance between mating components
 Backlash (sociology), a strong adverse reaction to an idea, action, or object
 Backlash (pressure group), a UK group opposing the 2008 law criminalising possession of "extreme pornography"

See also
Backflash (disambiguation)
Backslash, a typographical mark
Blacklash, or Whiplash, a Marvel Comics character